The Mindanao hornbill (Penelopides affinis), sometimes called the Mindanao tarictic hornbill, is a medium-small species of hornbill found in the canopy of rainforests on Mindanao, Dinagat, Siargao and Basilan in the southern Philippines. As is the case with all Philippine tarictic hornbills, it has been considered a subspecies of P. panini. The Samar hornbill is often included as a subspecies of the Mindanao hornbill.

Subspecies 
There are two subspecies:

 P. a. affinis (the nominate subspecies). Found on the islands of Mindanao, Dinagat and Siargao.
 P. affinis basilanica. Found on the island of Basilan.

Behavior 
It is social and often seen in pairs or small groups. These birds are noisy, emitting an incessant ta-rik-tik call, hence the name. Despite their noise they are difficult to find, being well camouflaged by the dense foliage.

Diet 
The principal food of Mindanao hornbill is fruit. It also eats insects, beetles, ants and earthworms (rarely).

In captivity
The Mindanao hornbill is often labelled as Penelopides panini in zoos, due to the taxonomic complications of this genus.  London Zoo used to keep a bird labeled in this way.  There are now very few Mindanao hornbills outside the Philippines.  Hong Kong Zoological and Botanical Gardens keep an elderly female.

References

 2. Clarido, A.P. (2017).Blacked- winged Clock: Hornbill

Further reading

BirdLife Species Factsheet
 Kemp, A. C. (2001). Family Bucerotidae (Hornbills). pp. 436–523 in: del Hoyo, J., Elliott, A., & Sargatal, J. eds. (2001). Handbook of the Birds of the World. Vol. 6. Mousebirds to Hornbills. Lynx Edicions, Barcelona. 

Mindanao hornbill
Birds of Mindanao
Fauna of Dinagat Islands
Fauna of Basilan
Mindanao hornbill
Mindanao hornbill